Megalostomis is a genus of case-bearing leaf beetles in the family Chrysomelidae. There are at least three described species in Megalostomis.

Species
These three species belong to the genus Megalostomis:
 Megalostomis dimidiata Lacordaire, 1848
 Megalostomis pyropyga Lacordaire, 1848
 Megalostomis subfasciata (J. L. LeConte, 1868)

References

Further reading

External links

 

Clytrini
Chrysomelidae genera
Taxa named by Louis Alexandre Auguste Chevrolat